Numa Perrier is a Haitian-American actress, artist, director, writer, and producer. She is a co-founder of Black&Sexy TV. Her debut feature film, Jezebel, premiered at SXSW in 2019 and received accolades from the American Black Film Festival and the Indie Memphis Film Festival.

Early life 
Perrier was born in Haiti and was adopted and raised in Washington state in a family of eight children. She got to know her biological mother when she was 17. Perrier moved to Las Vegas in late adolescence and did online "peep show" work as a cam girl to make money. Her savings allowed her to move to Los Angeles to pursue a career in film and visual art.

Career 
Perrier co-founded Black&Sexy TV, a creative collective and streaming service for Black millennial audiences, with former partners Dennis Dortch, Brian Ali Harding, and Jeanine Daniels in 2010. Their first collaboration was a film called A Good Day to Be Black and Sexy, which premiered at Sundance and was picked up by Magnolia Pictures. Beginning in 2011, they used YouTube to post their content. Notable shows include The Couple, The Number, Hello Cupid and RoomieLoverFriends. Numa starred in The Couple alongside Desmond Faison, and HBO picked up the series for development. 
 
In 2017, Perrier directed her first feature film Jezebel, starring Tiffany Tenille. The film is semi-autobiographical and draws on Perrier's experience as a "cam girl" performer. Perrier also co-stars in the film, which was shot on-location in Las Vegas. Jezebel premiered at SXSW in March 2019, and received positive critical reception. The Hollywood Reporter selected Jezebel as one of its "Best of SXSW 2019" picks. The Los Angeles Times referred to Perrier as "a very fine naturalistic actor" and gave further praise to her filmmaking, noting her "striking handling and welcome thoughtfulness of style." Array Releasing acquired the film in 2019 with a limited theatrical run and it debuted on Netflix on January 16, 2020. Perrier was awarded Best Director and Best Feature Film for Jezebel at the 2019 American Black Film Festival.

Perrier played a recurring guest star role on Showtime's SMILF prior to its cancellation. She has also directed television episodes for programs including Queen Sugar, The Wonder Years reboot, Cinema Toast, Reasonable Doubt, and Unprisoned. For her work on The Wonder Years, Perrier was nominated in the Outstanding Directing, Comedy Series category at the 2022 Black Reel Awards.

She also has a production company called House of Numa.

In 2020, it was announced Perrier would direct the Netflix romantic comedy The Perfect Find starring Gabrielle Union and Keith Powers. The film is slated for a 2022 release.

In December 2021, it was announced that she will produce and star in The Erotic, a biopic about poet and author Audre Lorde.

Perrier directed a live magic show, The Legend of Black Herman, as a part of Derek Fodjour's art installation, Magic, Mystery, and Legerdemain, which ran from March 29 to May 7, 2022 at The David Kordansky Gallery in Los Angeles.

In June, 2022, it was announced Perrier would produce and direct The War and Treaty, from a script by Will McCormack and Craig Borten, based on the life of the Nashville husband and wife vocal duo.

In November, 2022, it was announced Perrier would direct the Wall Street drama Midas Touch, with Chloe Bailey set to star. The film follows the true story of Lauren Simmons, the youngest equity trader on the floor of the New York Stock Exchange and only the second African American woman to hold that position.

Personal life 
Perrier has one daughter, Rockwelle, with former partner, Dennis Dortch. Dortch and Perrier split up in 2014.
Perrier married Gabrey Milner, son of Broadway playwright Ron Milner, in October 2020.

Filmography

Film

As Actress

As director

Television

As Actress

As director

References

External links 
 Numa Perrier on IMDb
 Black&Sexy TV Official website
 House of Numa  Official website

21st-century American actresses
21st-century Haitian actresses
American people of Haitian descent
American women film directors
American women film producers
Living people
1979 births
Haitian women film directors